Transcriptional regulator Kaiso is a protein that in humans is encoded by the ZBTB33 gene. This gene encodes a transcriptional regulator with bimodal DNA-binding specificity, which binds to methylated CGCG and also to the non-methylated consensus KAISO-binding site TCCTGCNA. The protein contains an N-terminal POZ/BTB domain and 3 C-terminal zinc finger motifs. It recruits the N-CoR repressor complex to promote histone deacetylation and the formation of repressive chromatin structures in target gene promoters. It may contribute to the repression of target genes of the Wnt signaling pathway, and may also activate transcription of a subset of target genes by the recruitment of catenin delta-2 (CTNND2). Its interaction with catenin delta-1 (CTNND1) inhibits binding to both methylated and non-methylated DNA. It also interacts directly with the nuclear import receptor Importin-α2 (also known as karyopherin alpha2 or RAG cohort 1), which may mediate nuclear import of this protein. Alternatively spliced transcript variants encoding the same protein have been identified.

Interactions 

ZBTB33 has been shown to interact with HDAC3, Nuclear receptor co-repressor 1 and CTNND1.

References

Further reading

External links 
 
 
 
 

Transcription factors